Workin' Moms is a Canadian television sitcom that premiered on CBC Television on January 10, 2017. The show stars Catherine Reitman, Jessalyn Wanlim, Dani Kind, Enuka Okuma, and Juno Rinaldi as a group of friends dealing with the challenges of being working mothers. The series is produced by Wolf + Rabbit Entertainment, the production company of Reitman and her husband, Philip Sternberg.

In February 2019, in the middle of season 3, the series premiered globally on Netflix. On May 29, 2019, Workin' Moms was renewed for a fourth season, which premiered on February 18, 2020. In April 2020, the series was renewed for a fifth season, which premiered on February 16, 2021. In June 2021, the series was renewed for a sixth season., which premiered on January 4, 2022. On June 20, 2022, creator Catherine Reitman announced that pre-production had begun on a seventh and final season, which premiered on January 3, 2023.

Cast

Main
 Catherine Reitman as Kate Foster
 Dani Kind as Anne Carlson 
 Juno Rinaldi as Frankie Coyne (seasons 1–5)
 Jessalyn Wanlim as Jenny Matthews (seasons 1, 3–7; recurring, season 2)
 Enuka Okuma as Sloane Mitchell (seasons 6-7; recurring, season 5)

Recurring
 Sarah McVie as Valerie "Val" Szalinsky (Season 1-7) 
 Raymond Ablack as Ram (Season 7) 
 Philip Sternberg as Nathan Foster
 Kyle Breitkopf as Nathan Jr. (seasons 6-7)
 Ryan Belleville as Lionel Carlson
 Sadie Munroe as Alice Carlson
 Dennis Andres as Ian Matthews (seasons 1–4)
 Katherine Barrell as Alicia Rutherford (seasons 1-2; guest seasons 4-5)
 Peter Keleghan as Richard Greenwood
 Nikki Duval as Rosie Phillips
 Kevin Vidal as Mo Daniels
 Jann Arden as Jane Carlson (seasons 1-4, guest season 5, 7)
 Oluniké Adeliyi as Giselle Bois (seasons 1-3 and 5, guest season 4)
 Jess Salgueiro as Mean Nanny/Renya (seasons 1–3)
 Novie Edwards as Sheila (season 1)
 Jennifer Pudavick as Gena Morris 
 Aviva Mongillo as Juniper (seasons 2-5, guest season 6)
 Tennille Read as Bianca Thomas (seasons 2-4, guest season 5)
 Donald MacLean Jr. as Forrest Greenwood (seasons 3, guest seasons 4-7)
 Victor Webster as Mike Bolinksi (season 4, guest season 3)
 Nelu Handa as Jade (season 4-5)
 Jayne Eastwood as Goldie (season 6)

Guest
 Varun Saranga as Chad (seasons 1–2)
 Alden Adair as Marvin Grimes (seasons 1–2)
 Mary Ashton as Sarah Hoffman (seasons 1–2)
 Dan Aykroyd as Kate's dad (season 1)
 Amanda Brugel as Sonia (season 2)
 Angela Asher as Dorothy Cutwater (season 2)
 Zachary Bennett as Carl (seasons 1–2)
 Mimi Kuzyk as Eleanor Galperin
 LaRonn Marzett as Tom (season 3)
 Ann Pirvu as Trish (season 4)
 Wendy Crewson as Victoria Stromanger
 Nadine Djoury as Iris
 Lisa Berry as Natashia 
 Erika Swayze as Brenna

Episodes

Availability 
In Canada, the series airs on CBC, and new episodes are released on CBC Gem the day after an episode is first broadcast. Seasons are available to stream on Netflix worldwide.

Awards and recognition 
In 2018 and 2019 the show was nominated for the International Emmy Award for Best Comedy Series.

In 2019, the show received 9 Canadian Screen Award nominations including Best Comedy Series and Best Actress for both show creator Catherine Reitman and Dani Kind. Reitman also received a nomination for Best Direction (for the episode “2005”), while Jann Arden, Amanda Brugel, and Peter Keleghan received recognition for Best Supporting or Guest Actor/Actress.

For the Canadian Screen Awards 2021, the show received a nomination for Best Comedy Series. Sarah McVie and Juno Rinaldi were both nominated for Best Supporting Actress, Comedy. Ryan Belleville and Peter Keleghan received Best Supporting Actor, Comedy nominations - while Colin Mochrie received a nomination for Best Guest Performance, Comedy. Catherine Reitman received a Best Direction, Comedy nomination, Kristin Fieldhouse a Best Photography, Comedy nomination and Marianna Khoury a Best Picture Editing, Comedy nomination. Both Dani Kind and Reitman were once again nominated for Best Lead Actress, Comedy.

Reception
On Rotten Tomatoes, season 1 has an approval rating of 77% based on reviews from 13 critics.

John Doyle of The Globe and Mail, wrote that the show "reeks of entitlement and privilege." Doyle further expressed sympathy for working mothers but not the show saying "The moms represent only a very specific, urban-bourgeois type. Their troubles are tiny, they live in luxury and their only contact with anything approaching the reality of contemporary life is via their nannies."

While Brad Oswald of the Winnipeg Free Press wrote that the show "demonstrates a deft ability to deliver punchlines while at the same time confronting the realities of 21st-century motherhood."

Regarding the show's fifth season, Cristina Iskander of Tell-Tale TV noted that "as a whole, Workin’ Moms Season 5 is a solid addition to the series... it maintains the general irreverence it’s become known for over the years while allowing for a more serious and somber tone than it’s traditionally had before."

References

External links
 
 
 

CBC Television original programming
2017 Canadian television series debuts
2010s Canadian sitcoms
2020s Canadian sitcoms
2010s Canadian workplace comedy television series
2010s Canadian LGBT-related comedy television series
2020s Canadian LGBT-related comedy television series
2020s Canadian workplace comedy television series
Television shows filmed in Toronto
Canadian LGBT-related sitcoms
Works about depression
English-language television shows
2023 Canadian television series endings
Workin' Moms